Partipolitiskt obundna i Svenska kyrkan (POSK) ("Non-partisans in Church of Sweden") is a nominating group working with the Church of Sweden. POSK was founded in 1987 as a platform for independents to contest Church elections. POSK is by far the largest non-party nominating group. POSK is represented in the Kyrkomötet (or Church Assembly) and in all Diocese Assemblies of the country.

POSK claims to be against partisan politics inside the Church, but is thought to belong to the right-wing of Church politics. POSK is seemingly divided on many controversial issues, such as female priesthood and gay marriage. Concerning female priesthood the official line is in favour of it, but promotes respect for the dissenting minority within the Church. POSK does not have any position on gay marriage, and refers the issue back to a theological consultation.

POSK wants to reform the electoral system of the Church, and remove it from party politics.

In the 2001 elections POSK won 36 out of 251 seats in the Church Assembly. In 2005 POSK passed through a split, as a group opposed to same-sex blessings left it to form Frimodig kyrka.

In the 2005 elections POSK got 13.7% and 34 seats.

References

External links
 Official website

Conservatism in Sweden
Nominating groups in Church of Sweden politics